Manfred Dubski (born 19 September 1954) is a retired German footballer. He made 190 appearances in the Bundesliga for Schalke 04 and MSV Duisburg as well as 210 matches in the 2. Bundesliga for Duisburg, Rot-Weiß Oberhausen and Union Solingen.

References

External links 
 

1954 births
Living people
German footballers
Association football midfielders
Bundesliga players
2. Bundesliga players
FC Schalke 04 players
MSV Duisburg players
Rot-Weiß Oberhausen players
SG Union Solingen players
People from Bottrop
Sportspeople from Münster (region)
Footballers from North Rhine-Westphalia